Phonemic imagery refers to the processing of thoughts as words rather than as symbols or other images.  It is sometimes referred to as the equivalent of inner speech or covert speech, and sometimes considered as a third phenomenon, separate from but similar to these other forms of internal speech.

Phonemic imagery is a part of the philosophy of consciousness rather than linguistics as it is considered an internal phenomenon of consciousness observed through reflection rather than amenable to empirical observation.

References 

Oral communication
Conceptual models
Thought